Navia lactea is a plant species in the genus Navia. This species is endemic to Venezuela.

References

lactea
Flora of Venezuela